Point Calimere Wildlife and Bird Sanctuary (PCWBS) is a  protected area in Tamil Nadu, South India along the Palk Strait where it meets the Bay of Bengal at Point Calimere (Tamil: கோடியக்கரை Kodiakkarai) at the southeastern tip of Nagapattinam District. The sanctuary was created in 1967 for conservation of the least concern blackbuck antelope, an endemic mammal species of India. It is famous for large congregations of waterbirds, especially greater flamingos. International name: Point Calimere Wildlife Sanctuary, IBA Code: IN275, Criteria: A1, A4i, A4iii. The  core area of this sanctuary has been proposed as a National Park

History
In the 8th century a brick and mortar lighthouse at Kodiakkarai (கோடியக்கரை) was said to have been built during the regime of vijayalacholan. In 1890 the British erected a  lighthouse at Kodiakkarai (கோடியக்கரை) which is still in use near the remains of the old Chola lighthouse.

Before 1968 AD Ptolemy referred to Point Calimere as Calligicum prom..  Use of the term Point Calimere appears to date back at least to between the early 16th century, when Portuguese traders started commercial contacts with nearby Nagapattinam town, and 1554 when they established a commercial center there. In the Portuguese language calido means warm and mar means sea.

Before 1892 the forests around Point Calimere were administered by the Revenue Department and Temple trustees who allowed local people to collect firewood, fish and minor forest products. Forest management practices in the area began in 1892 with creation of the  Kodaikadu Reserved Forest. A small area near the Sanyasin Muniaswar Temple was used by the British as a hunting ground and later cleared and replanted with casuarina and eucalyptus for firewood production. Some of these old trees remain. Palmyrah trees were planted to mark the village forests from the Reserved Forest near Munniappan Lake. There is a shrine to the deities Shevrayan and Soni located deep in the forests of the northern part of the sanctuary. A small village near Shevrayan Kovil shrine was relocated outside the sanctuary after the creation of Kodaikarai Reserve Forest. A few uncommon Indian tulip and neem trees from this old settlement still remain.

In the early 1900s small numbers of ponies were bred and large amounts of tobacco were grown in the neighbourhood. The promontory was once used as a sanitarium, but by 1909 was said to be malarious from April to June.
Bathing in the sea at Point Calimere was considered sacred by Hindus and a temple there was an object of pilgrimage.

In 1911 The reserve forest was under the control of the Trichy-cum-Thanjavor Forest Division. In 1922 the reserved forest was put under the control of the Revenue Divisional Officer, Mannargudi by the Governor of Madras. In 1938, Kodaikarai Extension No. 1 , Kodaikarai Estension No. 214.75  and Kodaikarai Estension No. 3  were added to form the present area of the sanctuary. In 1950 control of the forest was shifted to the Tiruchirapalli Forest Division, in 1957 to the Thanjavur Division and in 1965 to the State Wildlife officer in Chennai. In 1962 Dr. Salim Ali first identified The Point Calimere region as an area of high significance for the conservation of birds. In 1967 the sanctuary was created and put under control of the Thanjavar Forest Division and then to the Wildlife Division in Nagapattinam when that was created in 1986.

In 1936 a rail line was extended to Kodaikorai for transport of salt from Vedaranyam. Train service was halted in 1988 and the tracks were dismantled in 1995. During World War II a radar station was constructed and operated by Army personnel who had unquestioned access to the forests. In 1943 an experimental Casurina plantation was begun and soon extended by destruction of most of the natural forest. This resulted in a major decrease in numbers and variety of wild animals in the area.

In the early years of the Sanctuary management was concentrated on prevention of poaching and provision of water to the wildlife. Poaching has been controlled but water supply is a continuing effort. In 1979 the first of several water troughs supplied from water barrels transported by bullock cart and open wells were built. Beginning in 2001–02 several perennial water holes supplied by pipe from bore wells and a large elevated water tank on the western edge of the sanctuary were built.

Several tree planting schemes to increase biodiversity have yielded poor results, with the exception of Casuarina equisetifolia. Current practice is to avoid new tree planting and concentrate on removal of the invasive Prosopis juliflora. An annual wildlife census has been conducted since 1991.

The Bombay Natural History Society has been conducting regular bird migration studies in the sanctuary since 1959. In 2007 it is building a new field station in Kodaikadu.

On 9 March 1998 a  modern lighthouse near Kodaikorai Beach was commissioned.

In 1999 many speed breakers were installed on the Vedaranyam – Kodaikorai road which have effectively prevented the killing of wildlife by speeding vehicles. In 2004/05 nearly 100 boundary pillars were erected for boundary demarcation.

On 26 December 2004 a tsunami as high as 3 metres (10 ft) hit the Kodiyakarai coast of the sanctuary. Seawater flooded the entire sanctuary with four feet of water. The sanctuary escaped serious damage and the sanctuary, animals and birds largely survived the giant wave, but 5,525 people were killed in neighbouring parts of Nagapattinam District.

The documentary film Point Calimere – Little Kingdom by the Coast by Shekar Dattatri won the Centre for Media Studies (CMS) Vatavaran 2007 award in the Nature category.

Cultural heritage
Several sites of religious, historical or cultural importance are located within the sanctuary:

 Ramar Padam (literally: Ramas Footprint) located on the highest point of land in the sanctuary, is a small shrine containing the stone footprints of Lord Rama. Large numbers of Rama devotees gather here during the second week of April to celebrate Ram Navami Festival.
Kuzhagar Temple or Kodi Kuzhagar Temple (கோடிக் குழகர் கோயில்) (also called Amrithakadeswarar Temple) is a Hindu temple dedicated to Shiva, located in the town of Kodikkarai in Tamil Nadu, India. Kuzhagar is revered in the 7th century Tamil Saiva canonical work, the Tevaram, written by Tamil saint poets known as the nayanars and classified as Paadal Petra Sthalam. Kuzhagar temple is originally believed to have been built by the Cholas and it has several inscriptions dating back to the Chola period.
 Navakodi Sitthar Aalayam is a temple in south of the Kodiakkarai village. The history of this temple is the wedding ceremony of Lord Shiva and Parvathy Ammaal have been attended by lot many Sitthars at this location. Chola Emperor and Mannar Sarafoji were visited this temple. A small village called "Kanakkar Madam" near this shrine was demolished around 80 years ago and the people who were living there are relocated to Kodiakkarai village and they are still called as Kanakkarmadathiaar's family. A large congregation of devotees from all over Tamil Nadu state to come on special day of Amaavasai/Pournami to celebrate a special festival here every year. The greatest lord and the environment gives the peace like never ever feel.
 Sanyasin Muniaswar Kovil is a shrine between the eastern bank of Muniappan Lake and Kodaikarai Road visited by devotees on all auspicious occasions. On 20 March a special Puja is celebrated here.
 Mattumunian Kovil is a small temple in the south of the sanctuary where people worship and offer prayers throughout the year. A major festival occurs here on the 3rd Friday of September.
 Modi Mandapam is a shrine located near Ramar Padam where people of all castes worship. Hindu legend says that Lord Vedaraneswarer spends a night here with his consort during January – February. In the first week of March a major festival is held here.
 Avulaiganni Dargah is the grave of a Muslim saint located near the road by Ramar Padam. His death anniversary is observed here at the end of November.
 Shevrayan Kovil is a shrine to the deities Shevrayan and Soni located deep in the forests of the northern part of the sanctuary. A small village near this shrine was relocated outside the sanctuary after the creation of Kodaikarai Reserve Forest. A large congregation of devotees from Arcothurai celebrate a special festival here in June/July.

 Adivasi Colony is a backwards community of Ambalakars living in ramshackle huts of mud, coconut fronds and palmyrah leaves on the edge of Kodaikarai village. Their traditional livelihood was the collection of non-timber forest products in the areas that are now the sanctuary. These practices are now prohibited but not fully eliminated. Many of these people catch fish and small prawns in the nearby mudflats and swamps simply by groping in the water with their hands. Some work as day labour in the nearby salt pans. They have little interaction with other communities on the island.

 Chola Lighthouse is the remains of a brick and mortar lighthouse near Point Calimere said to have been built by the Cholas more than a thousand years ago. This structure was badly damaged by the 2004 Indian Ocean tsunami but can still be seen in the intertidal zone near the British lighthouse.
This dominates the sanctuary and may be seen by seamen far at sea.

Geography

The sanctuary, located adjacent to and east of Kodaikarai and Kodaikadu villages, is basically an Island surrounded by the Bay of Bengal to the east, the Palk Straight to the south and swampy backwaters and salt pans to the west and north. Coordinates are between 10.276 and 10.826 N and 79.399 to 79.884 E. Low sand dunes are located along the coast and along the western periphery with coastal plains, tidal mud-flats and shallow seasonal ponds in between. Sand dunes in the east are mostly now stabilised by Prosopis and the higher dunes in the west are stabilised by dense Tropical dry evergreen forests.

PCWBS forms the easternmost and most biologically diverse part of Ramsar Site no. 1210 which, on 19 August 2002, was declared a place of international importance for the conservation of waterbirds and their wetlands habitats. This  site comprises PCWBS, Panchanadikulam Wetland, Unsurveyed Salt swamp, Thalainayar Reserved Forest and Muthupet Mangroves. It is all part of the Great Vedaranyam Swamp, except the reserved forest.

Fauna
This sanctuary is an area of high biodiversity, with many unique species of animals and birds. See photos

Land animals
PCWBS is inhabited by fourteen mammal species, eighteen reptile species and nine amphibian species.

The flagship species of the sanctuary is the near threatened blackbuck antelope, one of the four antelope species in India (Chinkara, Chausingha and Nilgai being the other three) and the most numerous large animal in the sanctuary. The population estimate of the blackbuck at Point Calimere more than doubled in thirty years, from 750–800 in 1967 to 1,908 in 1998/99. This isolated population of blackbuck probably survived unmolested throughout the centuries due to the locals' now declining belief that eating its meat causes leprosy. The predators of the blackbuck at Point Calimere are jackals, and sometimes village dogs. Competition for food is from domestic and feral cattle.

Other notable animals include: spotted deer, jackal, bonnet monkey, wild boar, monitor lizard, short-nosed fruit bat, small Indian civet, star tortoise, Indian grey mongoose, black-naped hare, jungle cat and feral pony.

Marine animals
Bottlenose dolphin is frequently seen along the shore of the sanctuary in morning and evening hours during the winter. The shoreline beaches of the sanctuary are a regular nesting site of the endangered olive ridley turtle. In 2002 a pair of Bryde's whale were found washed ashore near the sanctuary. One 10 ton 35-foot whale was successfully towed back to sea. 
 This was the first successful rescue of a beached whale in Asia.

Waterbirds
This site has recorded the second largest congregation of migratory waterbirds in India, with a peak population in excess of 100,000, representing 103 species. Bombay Natural History Society researchers have captured, studied, ringed and released over 200,000 birds during the course of several ornithological studies here in the past several years.

In October these waterbirds arrive from Rann of Kutch, Eastern Siberia, Northern Russia, Central Asia and parts of Europe for their feeding season and start returning to those breeding places in January. These waterbirds include threatened species such as spot-billed pelican, Nordmann's greenshank, spoonbill sandpiper and black-necked stork. Near threatened species include black-headed ibis, Asian dowitcher, lesser flamingo, spoonbill, darter and painted stork.

Landbirds

Over  of the best tropical dry evergreen forest in India are in the sanctuary. They harbour a large variety of resident and migratory landbirds. The most common of the 35 resident species are white-browed bulbul, brahminy kite, small green-billed malkoha, crow pheasant, rose-ringed parakeet, grey partridge, blue-tailed bee-eater and common iora.

Spotted and collared doves are common in the mangroves.

Flora

This site is a mix of salt swamps, mangroves, backwaters, mudflats, grasslands and tropical dry evergreen forests. 364 of flowering plant species have been identified in the sanctuary of which 50% are herbs and the others are climbers, shrubs and trees. About 198 of these have medicinal properties. Manilkara hexandra, locally called Palai is the dominant dry evergreen species and an important food source for fruit eating birds. Middle canopy is dominated by the invasive Prosopis juliflora and the most abundant undergrowth is Memecylon umbellatum.

Threats

Major threats to the natural biodiversity and ecological balance of the sanctuary are: loss of habitat for waterbirds, soil and water salinisation by adjacent salt pans, spread of the invasive Prosopis juliflora, cattle grazing and scarcity of fresh water. Sanctuary staff conduct programs to alleviate all these issues.

Visitor information

The sanctuary is open all year from 6 am to 5 pm. The best weather at the sanctuary is during November and December when the area is cooled by the Northeast monsoon and the grasslands are the most luxuriant. The best time for bird watching is from October to January and the best time for animal viewing is from March to August.

A  paved road leads from the checkpoint to the villages of Kodaikadu and Kodaikarai. Vehicles are prohibited in the core of the sanctuary. Forest Department guides are available, with prior request to the Wildlife Warden, to escort visitors for bird and wildlife watching in the core of the sanctuary.

There are several watchtowers accessible to the public that provide panoramic views of the sanctuary. They are located at:
 Ramar Padam, a popular pilgrimage destination. The watchtower here is near the road at the northwest corner of the sanctuary just inside the entrance at Ramam Padam.
 in the center of the sanctuary that may be reached with the aid of a guide.
 at the eastern end of the sanctuary that may be reached with the aid of a guide.
 at the constables post on Kodaikarai beach at the end of the road near the southwest corner of the sanctuary is a tall damaged watchtower that requires a police escort to climb. It is not in the sanctuary, but provides a good view of it.

See also 
 Point Calimere
 Kodi Kuzhagar temple
 List of birds of South India

References

East Deccan dry evergreen forests
Wildlife sanctuaries in Tamil Nadu
Ramsar sites in India
Mangroves
1967 establishments in Madras State
Protected areas established in 1967